BIIK Shymkent is a women's football club based in Shymkent, Kazakhstan competing in the Kazakhstani Championship. Formerly established in Almaty as Alma-KTZh, the team won five championships in a row between 2004 and 2008 under this name and represented Kazakhstan in the European Cup, making it into the last 16 in four occasions. It was subsequently surpassed by SShVSM Almaty, but following its refoundation it won the 2010 national cup and the 2011 national championship. The team has played some seasons in the UEFA Women's Champions League.

Titles
 Kazakhstani Championship (16)
 2004, 2005, 2006, 2007, 2008, 2011, 2013, 2014, 2015, 2016, 2017, 2018, 2019, 2020, 2021, 2022
 Kazakhstani Cup (11)
 2007, 2008, 2010, 2011, 2012, 2013, 2014, 2015, 2016, 2017, 2018, 2019, 2020
 Kazakh Super Cup
 2013

UEFA Competition Record

Players

Current squad

Notable players

References

Women's football clubs in Kazakhstan
Association football clubs established in 2009
2009 establishments in Kazakhstan
Sport in Shymkent